The 7th Banija Assault Division was a Yugoslav Partisan division formed on 22 November 1942. It was formed from the 7th Banija Brigade, the 8th Banija Brigade and the 13th Proletarian Brigade. Pavle Jakšić commanded the division and its political commissar was Đuro Kladarin. For the most of its existence it operated in the areas controlled by the Independent State of Croatia.

References 

Divisions of the Yugoslav Partisans
Military units and formations established in 1942
Military units and formations disestablished in 1945
1942 establishments in Yugoslavia
1945 disestablishments in Yugoslavia